Anton Dmitriyevich Miterev (born 3 May 1996) is a Russian football player.

Club career
He made his professional debut in the Russian Professional Football League for FC Tom-2 Tomsk on 31 August 2014 in a game against FC Metallurg Novokuznetsk.

He made his Russian Premier League debut for FC Tom Tomsk on 3 March 2017 in a game against FC Rostov.

References

External links
 
 
 

1996 births
Living people
Russian footballers
Association football defenders
Russian expatriate footballers
Expatriate footballers in Belarus
Expatriate footballers in Latvia
Russian Premier League players
Latvian Higher League players
FC Tom Tomsk players
FC Krumkachy Minsk players
BFC Daugavpils players
FC Chita players
Sportspeople from Tomsk